Orfalu is a village in Vas county, Hungary.

Notable people
Notable people that were born or lived in Orfalu include
Károly Doncsecz, potter.

External links 
 Street map 

Populated places in Vas County
Hungarian Slovenes